Joseph Anthony Flynn III (November 8, 1924 – July 19, 1974) was an American actor. He was known for playing Captain Wallace Binghamton in the 1960s ABC television situation comedy McHale's Navy. Flynn was also a frequent guest star on 1960s TV shows, such as Batman, and appeared in several Walt Disney film comedies.

Early years
Flynn was born in Youngstown, Ohio to a physician. He graduated from Rayen High School in Youngstown and attended Northwestern University. During World War II, he served in the Army Special Services Branch entertaining the troops before moving west in 1946 to pursue acting and complete his education. He majored in political science at the University of Southern California.

Early career

Flynn had an interest in theater before leaving northeastern Ohio. He established himself early as a ventriloquist and radio disc jockey. He gained local celebrity as a director by guiding the Canfield Players in such productions as Harvey, Antigone and Pursuit of Happiness.

He broke into television in pre-network days in Los Angeles. In 1948, he starred in his own local situation comedy, Yer Old Buddy, produced and broadcast by pioneering television station KTLA.

After appearing in a number of stage plays, Flynn returned to Youngstown, where in 1950 he conducted an unsuccessful campaign for a seat in the Ohio Senate as a Republican.

Following his electoral defeat, Flynn pursued his acting career and appeared in nearly 30 films, including many Disney films. He later recalled watching an audience's reaction to his performance in the 1956 horror film The Indestructible Man starring Lon Chaney, Jr. Although he played a serious part in the picture, people laughed, which convinced him that comedy was his forte.

Flynn starred in several episodes of the syndicated 1957–1958 series The Silent Service, a show dedicated to the Navy's submarine service during World War II. He played Mr. Kelley in 15 episodes of The Adventures of Ozzie and Harriet and appeared in other classic series such as  The George Burns and Gracie Allen Show, The Twilight Zone, Gunsmoke (S4E27 as Onie Becker) and Make Room for Daddy. He was a regular on William Bendix's The Life of Riley and on The Adventures of Ozzie and Harriet. He appeared at least twice on NBC's The Ford Show, Starring Tennessee Ernie Ford. His appearance on March 30, 1961, was a patriotic program set at sea on the aircraft carrier USS Yorktown, to celebrate the 50th anniversary of naval aviation. He guest starred on Walter Brennan's ABC sitcom The Real McCoys, Tab Hunter′s NBC sitcom The Tab Hunter Show and on the syndicated western Pony Express.

McHale's Navy 
From 1962 to 1966, Flynn played the irascible Captain Wallace "Wally" Burton Binghamton (also known as "Old Leadbottom") on ABC's McHale's Navy in all but one episode, in which he became known for his exasperated catch phrases "What is it, What, WHAT, WHAT!?", "What in the name of the Blue Pacific/Halsey/Nimitz" and "I could just scream!" He also starred in two 1964 theatrical films spun off from the series, McHale's Navy and McHale's Navy Joins the Air Force.

In the spring of 1970, Flynn co-starred with Tim Conway, with whom he had worked in McHale's Navy and the two McHale's Navy films, in the situation comedy The Tim Conway Show as the inept operators of the single-plane charter airline Triple A Airlines. The unsuccessful show ran for only 12 episodes.

Flynn's career in feature films included the 1963 comedy Son of Flubber, in which he had a small part as a television announcer. Flynn later starred as Medfield College's Dean Higgins in a trio of Disney Studio films, The Computer Wore Tennis Shoes (1969), Now You See Him, Now You Don't (1972) and The Strongest Man in the World (1975), his final live-action film. Flynn also appeared in Did You Hear the One About the Traveling Saleslady? (1968), The Love Bug (1968), The Barefoot Executive (1971), The Million Dollar Duck (1971), How to Frame a Figg (1971) starring Don Knotts, Superdad (1973) starring Bob Crane and The Girl Most Likely To... (1973), a made-for-television dark comedy written by Joan Rivers.

Personal life 
In 1955, Flynn married Shirley Haskin, the daughter of director Byron Haskin. They had two children.

Later career and death 

Throughout his life, Flynn maintained a strong connection to his hometown. From 1969 to 1974, he was involved in northeastern Ohio's Kenley Players. He often returned to Youngstown to visit family residing on Elm Street on the city's north side. In recognition of his contributions to the broadcasting field, Flynn became the ninth recipient of the Ohio Association of Broadcasters Award.

In the early 1970s, Flynn spearheaded a movement on behalf of the Screen Actors Guild for more equitable distribution of TV residual payments.

He made a dozen appearances on The Tonight Show Starring Johnny Carson in 1972 and 1973. He hosted a revised edition of It Pays to Be Ignorant and was a guest panelist on the game show series Match Game '74 on January 17, 1974 (recorded on January 5, 1974), his final game show appearance.

On July 19, 1974, shortly after completing voice-over work as Mr. Snoops for Walt Disney's 23rd animated feature The Rescuers (released in 1977), Flynn's body was discovered by family members in the swimming pool of his Beverly Hills home, the victim of an apparent heart attack while swimming. Flynn's June 13, 1974, taping of The Merv Griffin Show had been announced for broadcast on July 19, prior to Flynn's death. He is interred in Culver City's Holy Cross Cemetery.

Selected filmography

The Babe Ruth Story (1948) — Extra (uncredited)
The Big Chase (1954) — Milton Graves — Reporter
The Seven Little Foys (1955) — Priest (uncredited)
The Desperate Hours (1955) — Motorist Hijacked by Hal (uncredited)
Trial (1955) — Speakers Bureau (uncredited)
Highway Patrol (1956) — Robber Steve Steve Stanky
The Steel Jungle (1956) — Marlin's Henchman (uncredited)
Indestructible Man (1956) — Bradshaw's Assistant (uncredited)
The Boss (1956) — Ernie Jackson
Portland Exposé (1957) — Ted Carl (uncredited)
Panama Sal (1957) — Barrington C. Ashbrook
This Happy Feeling (1958) — Dr. McCafferty
Go, Johnny, Go! (1959) — Head Usher (uncredited)
-30- (1959) — Hymie Shapiro
The Twilight Zone (1959) - insurance man #2 (Steve), in episode "Escape Clause"
Cry for Happy (1961) — John McIntosh
The Last Time I Saw Archie (1961) — Pvt. Russell Drexler
Lover Come Back (1961) — Hadley
Son of Flubber (1963) — Rex Williams (uncredited)
McHale's Navy (1964) — Captain Wallace B. Binghamton
McHale's Navy Joins the Air Force (1965) — Captain Wallace B. Binghamton
Divorce American Style (1967) — Lionel Blandsforth
Did You Hear the One About the Traveling Saleslady? (1968) — Hubert Shelton
I Dream of Jeannie (1968) — Dr. Corbett, in episode  "Dr. Bellows Goes Sane"
The Love Bug (1969) — Havershaw
The Computer Wore Tennis Shoes (1969) — Dean Higgins
That Girl (1970) — as Uncle Herbert, season 5 episode 13 "An Uncle Herbert for All Seasons"
The Wonderful World of Disney (1970) — Mayor Philbrick, in two-part episode "The Wacky Zoo of Morgan City"
How to Frame a Figg (1971) — Kermit Sanderson
The Barefoot Executive (1971) — Francis X. Wilbanks
The Million Dollar Duck (1971) — Finley Hooper
Sesame Street (1971) -Himself
Now You See Him, Now You Don't (1972) — Dean Higgins
Gentle Savage (1973) — Chief Deputy Moody
Superdad (1973) — Cyrus Hershberger
The Strongest Man in the World (1975) — Dean Higgins (posthumous release)
The Rescuers (1977) — Mr. Snoops (voice) (final film role, posthumous release)

References

External links
 
 

1924 births
1974 deaths
20th-century American male actors
American male film actors
American male television actors
American male voice actors
American murder victims
United States Army personnel of World War II
Burials at Holy Cross Cemetery, Culver City
California Republicans
Disney people
Male actors from Los Angeles
Male actors from Ohio
Military personnel from Ohio
Northwestern University alumni
Ohio Republicans
United States Army soldiers
University of Southern California alumni